Bartow Sumter Weeks (April 25, 1861 – February 3, 1922) was the President of the New York Athletic Club, President of the Amateur Athletic Union and a justice of the Court of Appeals of New York.

Biography
He was born on April 25, 1861, in Round Hill, Connecticut. He died on February 3, 1922, in Miami Beach, Florida. He was buried at Woodlawn Cemetery in The Bronx.

References

New York Supreme Court Justices
1861 births
1922 deaths
Burials at Woodlawn Cemetery (Bronx, New York)
International Olympic Committee members
People from Greenwich, Connecticut
Presidents of the New York Athletic Club
Presidents of the Amateur Athletic Union